A New Chance is the third and final studio album by Swedish indie pop duo The Tough Alliance. The album was released on 21 May 2007 by Sincerely Yours. It was issued outside of Sweden by Summer Lovers Unlimited and Modular Recordings.

Release
Originally, the album opened and closed with a sample of the first verse of Ibrahim, the 14th sura of the quran, recited by Abdul Basit ‘ABD us-Samad. However, a group of Muslims visited TTA’s Henning Fürst and argued that the usage was very offensive. Since that discussion, the first verse has been removed along with the Arabic imagery on the front cover. On the succeeding copies of the album, the cover has been replaced with a barcode.

Reception

Online music magazine Pitchfork placed A New Chance at number 149 on its list of top 200 albums of the 2000s.

Track listing

Charts

References

External links
The Tough Alliance Homepage
Sincerely Yours

2007 albums
The Tough Alliance albums